The Congressional Gaming Caucus is a Congressional Member Organization within the United States House of Representatives, as approved by the Committee on House Administration.

History of the Caucus
The Congressional Gaming Caucus was originally formed in the 20th century, as a means for Gambling and Casino Companies to have their voices heard on Congressional Issues.  However, since many states at the time had imposed a ban on gambling, the Congressional Caucus went under the name of the Congressional Gaming Caucus.  The Caucus was dissolved in the latter half of the 20th century, but continued to exist informally until it was officially reestablished in 2013 by Rep. Joe Heck (R-NV) and Bennie Thompson (D-MS). The Caucus was relaunched again in 2020 by Rep. Guy Reschenthaler (R) (PA-14) and Rep. Bennie Thompson (D) (MS-2), and is currently chaired by Reschenthaler and Rep. Dina Titus (D) (NV-01).

Information and purpose
According to founding member and Co-Chair Joe Heck (R-NV), the purpose of the Congressional Gaming Caucus is to:
Address employment and economic issues pertaining to the gaming industry, as well as working with the gaming industry to find solutions.
To promote training and skills improvement which can make jobs available to constituents and economically empower gaming communities;
Interacting with gaming companies and their representatives to hear their concerns and to share Member's concerns
Holding Member and staff level meetings on a regular basis to assure the effectiveness, viability, and relevance of the Caucus.

Membership
As of the 116th Congress, the Congressional Gaming Caucus has 33 members.

Current members

Rep. Bennie Thompson (MS-2) D
Rep. Guy Reschenthaler (PA-14) R
Rep. Steve Stivers (OH-15) R
Rep. Adam Kinzinger (IL-16) R
Rep. Alcee Hastings (FL-20) D
Rep. Danny K. Davis (IL-7) D
Rep. Stacey Plaskett (VI) D
Rep. Anthony Brown (MD-4) D
Rep. Barbara Lee (CA-13) D
Rep. Dina Titus (NV-1) D
Rep. Mark Amodei (NV-2) R
Rep. Dave Joyce (OH-14) R
Rep. Doug LaMalfa (CA-1) R
Rep. Marcia Fudge (OH-11) D
Rep. Luis Correa (CA-46) D
Rep. Haley Stevens (MI-11) D
Rep. Kelly Armstrong (ND) R
Rep. Jack Bergman (MI-1) R
Rep. Steven Palazzo (MS-4) R
Rep. Josh Gottheimer (NJ-5) D
Rep. Brendan Boyle (PA-2) D
Rep. Jefferson Van Drew (NJ-2) R
Rep. Markwayne Mullin (OK-2) R
Rep. Tom O'Halleran (AZ-1) R
Rep. Richard Neal (MA-1) D
Rep. Ruben Gallego (AZ-7) D
Rep. Eliot Engel (NY-16) D
Rep. Jared Golden (ME-2) D
Rep. Debbie Dingell (MI-12) D
Rep. Steven Horsford (NV-4) D
Rep. Susie Lee (NV-3) D
Rep. Paul Gosar (AZ-4) R

Former members
Fmr. Rep. Michael Grimm (NY-15)-Was sentenced to prison.
Fmr. Rep. Aaron Schock (IL-18)- Resigned due to an investigation around corruption charges.
Fmr. Rep. Shelley Berkley (NV-1)- Unsuccessfully ran for Senate in 2012 instead of defending her seat.
Fmr. Rep. Steven Horsford (D) (NV-4)- Lost his 2014 reelection bid.
Fmr. Rep. Jon Runyan Sr. (R) (NJ-3)- Chose not to seek reelection in 2014.
Fmr. Rep. Ann Kirkpatrick (AZ-1)- Unsuccessfully ran for Senate in 2016 instead of defending her seat.
Fmr. Rep. Joe Heck (R) (NV-3)- Unsuccessfully ran for Senate in 2016 instead of defending his seat.
Fmr. Rep. Pat Tiberi (R) (OH-12)- Resigned to lead the Ohio Business Roundtable

Controversy

In recent years, the Caucus has received scrutiny from members of the press and public for its connections to the Gambling and Casino industry.  Some examples include:

In 2007, it was reported that Former Co-Chair of the Congressional Gaming Caucus, Rep. Shelley Berkley (NV-1), received over $161,000 for her 2006 reelection campaign from various gambling and Casino Special Interest Groups.
In 2015, the Caucus lobbied the IRS to cancel its plans to lower the tax-reporting threshold for gambling earnings, a ruling intended to prevent tax fraud, despite the IRS receiving over 10,000 signatures requesting the measure to be enacted.  In the letter to the Internal Revenue Service, the Caucus stated: "We strongly believe the IRS should not consider any reduction of this reporting threshold, as any lowering from $1,200 would have significantly negative impacts on casino operations and customers.  Any reduction in this threshold would dramatically raise costs to comply, decrease gaming revenue due to more frequent slot machine 'lock-ups,' and would greatly increase the burden workload for IRS."
From 2007 to 2017, Representative Bennie Thompson (MS-2) has received $97,672 from MGM Corporations, and $69,525 from Caesars Entertainment.
From 2007 to 2017, Representative Dina Titus has received $130,050 from MGM Resorts International, and $38,850 from Caesars Entertainment.
From 2007 to 2014, Representative Steven Horsford has received $95,150 from MGM Resorts International, and $24,000 from Boyd Gaming in campaign contributions.

References

Caucuses of the United States Congress
United States federal gambling legislation